Germán Ferreira Caceres (born April 4, 1991 in Minas) was a Uruguayan professional footballer who last played for Academia Puerto Cabello During his career he played with Plaza Colonia (2014–16), Leones Negros (2017), Rentistas (2018), and Academia Puerto Cabello (2018). His position was defender.

In January 2022 he was mysteriously murdered.

References

External links
 

1991 births
Living people
Uruguayan footballers
Uruguayan expatriate footballers
Association football defenders
Club Plaza Colonia de Deportes players
Leones Negros UdeG footballers
C.A. Rentistas players
Academia Puerto Cabello players
Uruguayan Primera División players
Uruguayan Segunda División players
Ascenso MX players
Venezuelan Primera División players
Uruguayan expatriate sportspeople in Mexico
Uruguayan expatriate sportspeople in Venezuela
Expatriate footballers in Mexico
Expatriate footballers in Venezuela
People from Minas, Uruguay
People murdered in Uruguay